Edmund William George (14 March 1908 – 27 September 1963) was a Canadian politician, farmer and soldier. George served as a Liberal party member of the House of Commons of Canada.

George became a farmer by career, following graduation from Mount Allison University with a Bachelor of Arts in 1929. He served with the military in World War II with postings in North Africa and Europe.

He was first elected to Parliament at the Westmorland riding in the 1949 general election. After completing his only federal term, the 21st Canadian Parliament, George left the House of Commons and did not stand for re-election in the 1953 election.

References

External links
 
Edmund William George's Rootsweb profile

1908 births
1963 deaths
Canadian farmers
Canadian military personnel of World War II
Liberal Party of Canada MPs
Members of the House of Commons of Canada from New Brunswick
Mount Allison University alumni